Cocibolca may refer to:

 Cocibolca, the Nahuatl name of Lake Nicaragua
 Cocibolca, the proper name of star HD 4208